The Macronyssidae are a family of parasitic mites in the order Mesostigmata.

Genera and species

Arachnyssus Ma Liming, 2002
 Arachnyssus guangxiensis Ma Liming, 2002
 Arachnyssus huwenae Ma-Liming, 2002
Argitis Yunker & Saunders, 1973
 Argitis oryzomys Yunker & Saunders, 1973
Bdellonyssus Fonseca, 1941
 Bdellonyssus bacoti (Hirst, 1913)
Chiroecetes Herrin & Radovsky, 1974
 Chiroecetes lonchophylla Herrin & Radovsky, 1974
Chiroptonyssus Auguston, 1945
 Chiroptonyssus brennani Yunker, Lukoschus & Giesen, 1990
 Chiroptonyssus robustipes (Ewing, 1925)
Coprolactistus Radovsky & Krantz, 1998
 Coprolactistus whitakeri Radovsky & Krantz, 1998
Glauconyssus K. Uchikawa, 1991
 Glauconyssus tanzaniensis K. Uchikawa, 1991
Hirstesia Fonseca, 1948
 Hirstesia sternalis (Hirst, 1921)
Kolenationyssus Fonseca, 1948
 Kolenationyssus athleticus Fonseca, 1948
Lepidodorsum R.C.Saunders & Yunker, 1975
 Lepidodorsum tiptoni Saunders & Yunker, 1975
Liponyssus Kolenati, 1858
 Liponyssus setosus (Kolenati, 1857)
Macronyssus Kolenati, 1858
 Macronyssus aristippe (Domrow, 1959)
 Macronyssus chuanguiensis Zhou, Zhang, Jiang & Wang, 1996
 Macronyssus dechangensis Zhou, Zhang, Jiang & Wang, 1996
 Macronyssus emeiensis Zhou, Wang & Wang, 1996
 Macronyssus evansi Stanjukovich, 1990
 Macronyssus flavus (Kolenati, 1856)
 Macronyssus fujianensis Zhou, Wang & Wang, 1996
 Macronyssus granulosus (Kolenati, 1856)
 Macronyssus hongheensis Gu & Tao, 1996
 Macronyssus hosonoi Uchikawa, 1979
 Macronyssus laifengensis Wang & Shi, 1986
 Macronyssus leislerianus Fain, Walter & Heddergott, 2003
 Macronyssus leucippe (Domrow, 1959)
 Macronyssus longimanus Kolenati, 1858
 Macronyssus miraspinosus Gu & Wang, 1985
 Macronyssus murini Uchikawa, 1979
 Macronyssus quadrispinosus Tian & Gu, 1992
 Macronyssus rhinolophi (Oudemans, 1902)
 Macronyssus shimizui Uchikawa, 1979
 Macronyssus taiyuanensis Tian & Gu, 1992
 Macronyssus tashanensis Li & Teng, 1985
 Macronyssus tieni (Grochovskaya & Nguen Xuan Hoe, 1961)
 Macronyssus uncinatus (G. Canestrini, 1885)
 Macronyssus ventralis (Wen, 1975)
 Macronyssus xianduensis (Zhou, Tang & Wen, 1982)
 Macronyssus yesoensis Uchikawa, 1979
 Macronyssus zhijinensis Gu & Wang, 1985
Mitonyssoides C. E. Yunker, F. S. Lukoschus & K. M. T. Giesen, 1990
 Mitonyssoides stercoralis C. E. Yunker, F. S. Lukoschus & K. M. T. Giesen, 1990
Mitonyssus C. E. Yunker & F. J. Radovsky, 1980
 Mitonyssus molossinus Yunker & Radovsky, 1980
 Mitonyssus noctilio C. E. Yunker & F. J. Radovsky, 1980
Neoichoronyssus Fonseca, 1941
 Neoichoronyssus hubbardi (Jameson, 1949)
 Neoichoronyssus wernecki (Fonseca, 1935)
Neoliponyssus Ewing, 1929
 Neoliponyssus gordonensis (Hirst, 1923)
Nycteronyssus Saunders & Yunker, 1973
 Nycteronyssus desmodus Saunders & Yunker, 1973
Ophionyssus Mégnin, 1883
 Ophionyssus arnhemlandensis (Womersley, 1956)
 Ophionyssus dolatelacensis Fain & Bannert, 2002
 Ophionyssus ehmanni Domrow, 1985
 Ophionyssus galeotes Domrow, Heath & Kennedy, 1980
 Ophionyssus galloticolus Fain & Bannert, 2000
 Ophionyssus javanensis Micherdzinski & Lukoschus, 1987
 Ophionyssus lacertinus (Berlese, 1892)
 Ophionyssus myrmecophagus (Fonseca, 1954)
 Ophionyssus natricis (Gervais, 1844)
 Ophionyssus saurarum (Oudemans, 1901)
 Ophionyssus schreibericolus Moraza, 2009
 Ophionyssus scincorum Domrow, Heath & Kennedy, 1980
 Ophionyssus setosus Fain & Bannert, 2000
 Ophionyssus tropidosaurae (Till, 1957)
Ornithonyssus Sambon, 1928
Ornithonyssus acrobates Micherdzinski & Domrow, 1985
Ornithonyssus africanus (Zumpt & Till, 1958)
Ornithonyssus bacoti (Hirst, 1913)
Ornithonyssus benoiti Till, 1982
Ornithonyssus bursa (Berlese, 1888)
Ornithonyssus campester Micherdzinski & Domrow, 1985
Ornithonyssus capensis Shepherd & Narro, 1983
Ornithonyssus conciliatus (Radovsky, 1967)
Ornithonyssus costai Micherdzinski, 1980
Ornithonyssus dasyuri Domrow, 1983
Ornithonyssus desultorius (Radovsky, 1966)
Ornithonyssus flexus (Radovsky, 1967)
Ornithonyssus garridoi de-la-Cruz, 1981
Ornithonyssus jayanti (Advani & Vazirani, 1981)
Ornithonyssus kochi (Fonseca, 1948)
Ornithonyssus latro Domrow, 1963
Ornithonyssus longisetosus Micherdzinski, 1980
Ornithonyssus lukoschusi Micherdzinski, 1980
Ornithonyssus matogrosso (Fonseca, 1954)
Ornithonyssus noeli de-la-Cruz, 1983
Ornithonyssus nyctinomi (Zumpt & Patterson, 1951)
Ornithonyssus petauri Micherdzinski, 1980
Ornithonyssus pereirai (Fonseca, 1935)
Ornithonyssus pipistrelli (Oudemans, 1904)
Ornithonyssus praedo Domrow, 1971
Ornithonyssus roseinnesi (Zumpt & Till, 1953)
Ornithonyssus simulatus Micherdzinski, 1980
Ornithonyssus spinosa Manson, 1972
Ornithonyssus stigmaticus Micherdzinski & Domrow, 1985
Ornithonyssus sylviarum (G. Canestrini & Fanzago, 1877)
Ornithonyssus taphozous Micherdzinski & Domrow, 1985
Oudemansiella Fonseca, 1948
 Oudemansiella saurarum (Oudemans, 1901)
Parichoronyssus Radovsky, 1966
 Parichoronyssus bakeri Morales-Malacara & Guerrero, 2007
 Parichoronyssus crassipes Radovsky, 1967
 Parichoronyssus cyrtosternum Radovsky, 1967
 Parichoronyssus euthysternum Radovsky, 1967
 Parichoronyssus kretzschmari Heddergott, 2008
 Parichoronyssus lopezi Morales-Malacara, 1996
 Parichoronyssus moralesmalacari Heddergott, 2008
 Parichoronyssus radovskyi Morales-Malacara, 1992
 Parichoronyssus sclerus Radovsky, 1966
Pellonyssus Clark & Yunker, 1956
 Pellonyssus gorgasi Yunker & Radovsky, 1966
 Pellonyssus nidi Gu & Duan, 1991
 Pellonyssus nidicolus Baker, Delfinado & Abbatiello, 1976
 Pellonyssus reedi (Zumpt & Patterson, 1952)
Radfordiella Fonseca, 1948
 Radfordiella oudemansi Fonseca, 1948
Steatonyssus Kolenati, 1858
 Steatonyssus aglaiae Stanjukovich, 1991
 Steatonyssus allredi Advani & Vazirani, 1981
 Steatonyssus balcellsi Estrada-Pena & Sanchez, 1988
 Steatonyssus cavus Rybin, 1992
 Steatonyssus decisetosus Advani & Vazirani, 1981
 Steatonyssus desertorus Rybin, 1992
 Steatonyssus flabellifer Gupta & Paul, 1985
 Steatonyssus furmani Tipton & Boese, 1958
 Steatonyssus lonchura Gupta & Paul, 1992
 Steatonyssus megaporus Gu & Wang, 1980
 Steatonyssus musculi (Schrank, 1803)
 Steatonyssus noctulus Rybin, 1992
 Steatonyssus nyctali Gu & Wang, 1982
 Steatonyssus patriciae Domrow, 1969
 Steatonyssus quadrisetosus Advani & Vazirani, 1981
 Steatonyssus sinicus Teng, 1980
 Steatonyssus surinamensis Yunker, Lukoschus & Giesen, 1990
 Steatonyssus teidae Estrada-Pena & Sanchez, 1988
Synasponyssus Radovsky & Furman, 1969
 Synasponyssus wenzeli Radovsky & Furman, 1969
Trichonyssus Domrow, 1959
 Trichonyssus australicus (Womersley, 1956)
 Trichonyssus caputmedusae Domrow, 1986
 Trichonyssus lukoschusi Micherdzinski & Domrow, 1985
 Trichonyssus nixoni Micherdzinski & Domrow, 1985
 Trichonyssus solivagus Domrow, 1986
 Trichonyssus streetorum Micherdzinski & Domrow, 1985
 Trichonyssus womersleyi Domrow, 1959

References

Mesostigmata
Taxa named by Anthonie Cornelis Oudemans
Acari families